William Pitt Root (born 1941 Austin, Minnesota) is an American poet.

He was raised in Fort Myers, Florida.

He studied at the University of Washington, and University of North Carolina at Greensboro.

He was Tucson Poet Laureate from 1997 to 2002, and taught at Hunter College.
He was a US/UK Exchange Artist, Rockefeller Foundation fellow, Guggenheim Fellow, Wallace Stegner Fellow at Stanford University, and an NEA fellow.

His work appeared in Asheville Poetry Review, The Atlantic, New Yorker, Harpers, The Nation, Commonweal, American Poetry Review, Triquarterly, and Poetry. He is poetry editor of Cutthroat Magazine.

He is married to poet Pamela Uschuk; they live near Durango, Colorado and Tucson Arizona

Works
"Song of the Piper", Poetry Foundation
"Temperance Poems", Poetry Foundation
 "Strange Angels: New Poems" Wins Press, 2013, 
 "Sublime Blue: Selected Early Odes of Pablo Neruda" Wings Press, 2013, 
 White Boots: New and Selected Poems of the West Carolina Wren Press, 2006, 
 Trace Elements from a Recurring Kingdom: The First Five Books of WPR Confluence Press, 1994, 
 Faultdancing, University of Pittsburgh Press, 1986, 
 Invisible Guests (1983)
 Reasons for Going It on Foot Atheneum, 1981, 
 In the World's Common Grasses Moving Parts Press, 1981
 Coot and Other Characters Confluence Press, 1977, 
 Fireclock Four Zoas Night House, 1981, 
 Striking the Dark Air for Music Atheneum, 1973, 
 The Storm and Other Poems Atheneum, 1969; reprint Carnegie Mellon University Press, 2005,

References

External links
"An Interview with William Pitt Root", turnrow
"WILLIAM PITT ROOT", Tucson Weekly, 1998
"A Conversation with William Pitt Root", The Drunken Boat, October 2003
"White Boots: New and selected poems of the West", InsideOutMag, March April 2007, Katharine Niles

1941 births
Living people
American male poets
University of Washington alumni
University of North Carolina at Greensboro alumni
Hunter College faculty
Rockefeller Fellows
National Endowment for the Arts Fellows
People from Austin, Minnesota
Poets from Minnesota
People from Fort Myers, Florida
Poets from Florida
Stegner Fellows